Jack Fincher may refer to:

Jack Fincher (footballer), Australian rules footballer in the VFL
Jack Fincher (screenwriter), served as chief editor of Life magazine